WWBB (101.5 FM, "B101") is a radio station in Providence, Rhode Island, United States. The station plays classic hits from the 1970s, 1980s and 1990s. WWBB's offices and studios are located on Oxford Street in Providence, on the 3rd and 4th floors of the Roland Building near Interstate 95. WWBB's transmitting antenna is located on the roof of One Financial Plaza, also in Providence. WWBB transmits a directional signal to reduce interference to Boston-based sister station 101.7 WBWL. The station is owned by iHeartMedia, Inc.

On-air staff

Former staff
Notable former WWBB on-air staff includes Tom Campbell, Mark Ambrose, Ray Anthony, Jed Barton, Big John Bina, Robby Bridges, Daria Bruno, Kenny Cool, Melissa Culross, Austin Davis, Bob Kay, Amy Hagan, Tiffany Hill, Michele Hughes, Larry "Ice Cold" Kruger, Roger Letendre, Rick Lyle, Bobby Michaels, Rebecca Morse-Whitten, Rockin' Rob Mullin, Mike O'Reilly, Cruisin' Bruce Palmer, Paul Perry, Keri Rodrigues, Jeff Ryan, Randy Saxx, Dr. Don Spencer, Tom St. John, Norm Thibeault, and Steve Valentine.

History
WWBB's history dates back to May 30, 1955, when it began broadcasting in Providence as WTMH.  These call letters reflected the initials of its owner, T. Mitchell Hastings.  In 1958, Hastings reorganized his General Broadcasting Corporation as Concert Network, Inc., and changed the call letters to WXCN. As a Concert Network affiliate, it broadcast classical music, as part of a chain that included WBCN in Boston, WNCN in New York City, and WHCN in Hartford, Connecticut.

The station was sold in 1963, and after another change in ownership the following year, it became WCRQ. By the late 1960s, the station changed owners again, becoming WLKW-FM, a sister station of AM 990 WLKW. For two decades as WLKW-FM, it aired a beautiful music format, often the top FM station in Providence. In 1987, the station was sold.  Two years later, the easy listening format was dropped and WLKW-FM became WWBB.  The station switched to oldies as B101.5 at Noon on December 26, 1989, playing a mix of hits from the 1950s and 1960s. The next day, B101.5 rebranded as B-101. The first song on B-101 was Rock Around the Clock by Bill Haley and the Comets. In 1995, B-101 was bought out by Clear Channel Communications. In the 1990s, some hits from the 1970s were added, and fewer '50s songs were heard. The first jingle package was a Hodge podge of Q-Cuts and cuts from Positron. There was also use of TM Century jingles for a time in the early days but the station used the Do It Again jingle package by JAM Creative Productions (used on many other oldies stations) for its first dozen years.

As the 21st century dawned, WWBB adjusted its playlist. Music from the 1950s was phased out. More music from the 1970s began to appear, and in March 2003, the slogan changed from "Good Times And Great Oldies" to "Big Hits Of The 60s And 70s". It was around this time, that former program director Bill Hess re-positioned the station as "Big Hits, B101." Since 2005, hits from the 1980s were added to the playlist, with fewer ‘60s songs included. Over the years, the number of songs in rotation has shrunk from approximately 1,500 to 650. In 2013, WWBB's slogan was changed to "Southern New England's '70s and '80s Hits". In 2018, The slogan was once again changed to "The ‘80s and More", focusing on '80s music with a moderate amount of '70s hits and very few (if any) songs from the 1960s. The station has included some '90s songs recently.

Signal reduction and coverage change
On August 6, 2014, Clear Channel (now iHeartMedia) filed a "contingent application" with the U.S. Federal Communications Commission covering adjacent stations 101.7 WBWL in Lynn, Massachusetts, and 101.9 WCIB in Falmouth, Massachusetts, to improve WBWL's coverage in the Boston area.  Boston is a much larger radio market than Providence, so boosting WBWL's signal would improve its advertising and revenue potential, despite the reduced coverage for WWBB and WCIB.  The application called for downgrading WWBB's signal from a "Class B" (50,000-watt equivalent) to a "Class A" (6,000-watt equivalent) and using a directional signal away from Boston. The application also called for the relocation of WWBB antenna to the roof of a building in downtown Providence, a further step in reducing its coverage outside Providence and its suburbs. The application was granted October 6, 2014. WWBB completed the facility change in January 2015, and changed to the new facility on February 2, 2015.

HD Radio
Upon the signal reduction, HD digital service continued but the iHeart-provided comedy programming service (known as "Joke Joke") on WWBB-HD2 was discontinued and WWBB instead only simulcast its main analog feed into HD digital via WWBB-HD1. By 2018, WWBB-HD2 resumed operations, this time as a highly-automated easy listening/instrumental-formatted subchannel with an hourly ID called Spa Radio.

References

External links
B101 WWBB official website

WBB
Classic hits radio stations in the United States
Radio stations established in 1955
1955 establishments in Rhode Island
IHeartMedia radio stations